Chunabhatti, is a railway station on the Harbour Line of the Mumbai Suburban Railway.

Mumbai Suburban Railway stations
Railway stations in Mumbai City district
Mumbai CR railway division